Altham may refer to:

Altham, Lancashire, village and a civil parish in the Hyndburn district of Lancashire, England
Altham (car), American automobile manufactured from 1896 to 1899
HMS Altham, British inshore minesweeper
Altham (surname)
Baron Altham, title in the Peerage of Ireland, held by the Annesley family